was a town located in Ama District, Aichi Prefecture, Japan.

As of 2003, the town had an estimated population of 23,961 and a density of 2,415 persons per km². The total area was 9.92 km².

On March 22, 2010, Miwa, along with the towns of Shippō and Jimokuji (all from Ama District), was merged to form the new city of Ama.

External links 
  

Dissolved municipalities of Aichi Prefecture
Ama, Aichi